The 30th Armored Division was a Tennessee-based unit of the Army National Guard from the 1950s to the 1970s.

Activation and service
In 1954 the 30th Infantry Division was reorganized, with units in North Carolina and South Carolina constituting the 30th Infantry Division, and units in Tennessee forming the nucleus of the new 30th Armored Division.

Though never federalized during wartime, the 30th Armored Division (called "Volunteers," for Tennessee's "Volunteer State" nickname) was activated for support to law enforcement, including responses to civil disturbances in Memphis and Nashville after the assassination of Martin Luther King Jr.

In 1968 the headquarters of the Mississippi Army National Guard's 108th Armored Cavalry Regiment was reorganized as 1st Brigade, 30th Armored Division.  (The brigade was subsequently designated the 155th Separate Armored Brigade.)  In addition, in 1968 units from the Florida Army National Guard and Alabama Army National Guard also became part of the 30th Armored Division.

The 30th Armored Division was inactivated in December, 1973.

Commanders

The following officers served as commander of the 30th Armored Division:

MG Paul H. Jordan, 1954-1957
MG Robert E. Frankland, 1957-1959
MG Warren C. Giles, 1959-1962
MG Clarence B. Johnson, 1962-1963
MG William R. Douglas, 1963-1966
MG Thomas G. Wells Jr., 1966-1968
MG Hugh B. Mott, 1968-1969
MG Glynn C. Ellison, 1969-1971
MG Carl M. Lay, 1971-1973
MG John M. Calhoun, 1973

Lineage
During its existence the 30th Armored Division was never deployed as an organization, and received no combat honors.  Several members volunteered individually to join regular Army units during the Vietnam War.

The 30th Armored Division's lineage was carried by the Tennessee Army National Guard's 30th Armored Brigade until the brigade's inactivation in 1996.

References

30th Armored Division, U.S.
Divisions of the United States Army National Guard
Military units and formations established in 1954
Military units and formations disestablished in 1973